Michael O'Dwyer is an Irish academic who was awarded the Chevalier dans l'ordre des Palmes académiques, for his services to French Literary Studies, by French Prime Minister François Fillon in 2010. 
Michael was born in 1947 in Ballyhaunis, county Mayo, he studied at St. Patrick's College, Maynooth gaining a BA degree, he completed further studies in Toulouse, earning an MA and University of Paris Sorbonne Nouvelle where he obtained his doctorate.  Dr. O'Dwyer returned to Maynooth, lecturing in the French department, where he went on to serve as Department head. Dr. O'Dwyer also served as Dean of Arts, in Maynooth.
He retired from lecturing in 2010.

References

Alumni of St Patrick's College, Maynooth
Academics of St Patrick's College, Maynooth
1947 births
People from County Mayo
Living people